Norbert Miller (born 14 May 1937) is a German scholar of literature and art. He was professor of literary studies at the Technische Universität Berlin from 1973 and retired in 2006.

Life 
Born in Munich, Miller grew up in Berlin, Vienna and Munich and studied literature, musicology and art history in Frankfurt and Berlin. Around 1958 he came into contact with Walter Höllerer in Frankfurt, who became his teacher and friend. From 1962 to 1965 Miller was Höllerer's assistant at the Johann Wolfgang Goethe University Frankfurt am Main. Later he joined Hans Mayer as his assistant.

From 1973 Miller held a full professorship for Comparative Literature Studies at the TU Berlin. He was managing director of the institute there until 2004.

Miller is still the editor of the journal  and founded the  together with Walter Höllerer.

Achievements 
Miller's research focuses on European literature, art and music of the 18th to 20th centuries. In particular, he has repeatedly researched the debates of European classicism between Winckelmann and Byron in numerous essays and books, whereby the aesthetics transfer processes between the arts are the focus of his representations. As an art scholar, he has been fascinated by the anti-classical tendencies in European art since the Enlightenment, and has shown them to be a source of inspiration with his books on Giovanni Battista Piranesi. (1978), Horace Walpole (1986) and William Beckford (2012) are dedicated to weighty monographs. At the centre of his research on music are the configurations of Romantic music, especially with regard to the history of Opera seria in the 19th century.

On various occasions - especially in the work on European Romanticism in Music (1999/ 2007) - he worked together with the musicologist Carl Dahlhaus. He is editor of the works of Goethe (Munich Edition), Jean Paul, Gérard de Nerval and Marie Luise Kaschnitz. Furthermore, he is co-editor of the critical edition of Nietzsches works.

Memberships 
 Deutsche Akademie für Sprache und Dichtung, Darmstadt
 Berlin-Brandenburgische Akademie der Wissenschaften, Berlin
 Academy of Arts, Berlin
 Akademie der Wissenschaften und der Literatur, Mainz
 PEN-Zentrum Deutschland, Darmstadt

Honours and awards 
 2009:  of the Goethe-Gesellschaft Weimar
 2010: 
 2010: Verdienstkreuz 1. Klasses Verdienstordens der Bundesrepublik Deutschland
 2018: Bayerischer Maximiliansorden für Wissenschaft und Kunst

Work 
 Der empfindsame Erzähler. Untersuchungen an Romananfängen des 18. Jahrhunderts. Hanser Verlag, München 1968 (Phil. Diss. FU Berlin 1967)
 Archäologie des Traums. Versuch über Giovanni Battista Piranesi. Hanser Verlag, München 1978
 Einführung. In Paul Heyse. Eine Bibliographie, hrsg. von Werner Martin, Georg Olms Verlag, Hildesheim / New York 1978, S. V-XI.
 Strawberry Hill. Horace Walpole und die Ästhetik der schönen Unregelmäßigkeit. Hanser Verlag, Munich 1986
 Emanuel Geibel, Paul Heyse und das literarische München zur Zeit Maximilians II. In: "In uns selbst liegt Italien" – Die Kunst der Deutsch-Römer, edited by Christoph Heilmann, Hirmer Verlag, Munich 1987, .
 Paul Heyse – der Bürger als Dichterfürst. Zur Neuausgabe der sämtlichen Werke. In: Paul Heyse – Gesammelte Werke. Reihe III, volume 5, Nachdruck Georg Olms Verlag, Hildesheim / Zürich / New York 1991, .
 With Carl Dahlhaus: Europäische Romantik in der Musik. Two volumes, Stuttgart: Metzler, 1999/2007.
 Der Wanderer. Goethe in Italien. Hanser Verlag, Munich 2002
 Die ungeheure Gewalt der Musik. Goethe und seine Komponisten. Hanser Verlag, Munich 2009
 Fonthill Abbey. Die dunkle Welt des William Beckford. Hanser, Munich 2012, 
 Marblemania. Kavaliersreisen und der römische Antikenhandel. Deutscher Kunstverlag, Munich 2018, .

References

External links 

Literary scholars
German art historians
Members of the Academy of Arts, Berlin
Academic staff of the Technical University of Berlin
Officers Crosses of the Order of Merit of the Federal Republic of Germany
1937 births
Living people